Amanah is an Arabic term used for mayoralty or municipality.

In some Arabic countries, the Amanah is the municipality of the capital.

Examples 
 Amanat Baghdad
 Greater Amman Municipality
 Municipality of the Holy City
 Sana Municipality

References 

Arabic words and phrases
Types of administrative division